Abu Isa (also known as Ovadiah, Ishaq ibn Ya'qub al-Isfahani, Isaac ibn Jacob al-Isfahani) was a self-proclaimed Jewish prophet sometime in the 8th century CE in Persia and the leader of a short-lived revolt. Proclaimed by some of his followers to be the Messiah, Abu Isa himself never made such claims or inferences. He seems to have allied himself with Sunbadh after the assassination of Abu Muslim in 755 CE. His forces fought Caliph al-Mansur's army at Rayy only to be defeated. Abu Isa fell in this battle.

Dating issues
The dating of Abu Isa's career has been disputed since the Middle Ages. The two main sources for information of him are Qirqisani, a Jewish Karaite historian; and Shahrastani, who wrote an extensive guide to Jewish sects over the ages. Qirqisani places the events in the reign of the Umayyad Caliph Abd al-Malik (685 - 705 CE) while Shahrastani says it began under the reign of Marwan II (744 - 750) on through to Al-Mansur (d. 775). Qirqisani's dates place Abu Isa's uprising during Umayyad clashes with the Byzantines which would coincide with Messianic stories of the battle between Gog and Magog and place it early enough to influence Karaism; Shahrastani's would put the revolt at the end of the Umayyad Dynasty and thus at a pivotal point of upheaval in the Muslim world. Both are plausible and there is no direct Isawite documentation.

The Turkish scholar Halil Ibrahim Bulut in 2004 has shown that Shahrastani's 'Abbasid date is more likely.

Beliefs
Abu Isa believed that he was the last of five heralds from God announcing the imminent arrival of the messiah. Never did he claim to be the Messiah himself, but some of his followers felt that he would return after his death and bring the End Times. He made some minor alterations to the general set of Rabbinic laws and his followers became ascetic in their manners. The most radical of the Isawite beliefs was the acceptance of both Jesus and Muhammad as true prophets, but only to their own peoples. 
Other alterations included:
Banning of the consumption of wine and meat at certain times;
Sunnah prayers to 7 or 10 depending on the source (in addition to the standard 3);
Affirmation of the Shammai stance on divorce;
Belief that Alnabi is a collection of Hakhams;

The ban on meat is actually a Talmudic reference to not eating meat in exile, while the additional prayers are usually explained by noting Psalm 119:164.

Miracles
Two major miracles are attributed to Abu Isa.  The first stems from his writings, as he was known to his followers as nothing but an illiterate tailor before he was touched with prophecy. He is said to have thus produced the works that outline the beliefs above and herald the coming of the Messianic age. The other is during the revolt itself when he defended his followers from the Caliphate's forces behind a line drawn on the ground with a myrtle branch, at which point he rode out and singlehandedly defeated the first assault by the Muslims.

Possible connection to Shi'ism

The arrival of Abu Isa comes at an interesting point in the history of the Jews and the Muslims. Regardless of the which dates are true, each could be seen as during the rise of the radical Shi'a movements in Islam.  With the center of these movements being Iraq and later Persia, it should come as no surprise that the other ahl al-kitab or "People of the Book" might be influenced. Some Jews actually saw the coming of the Arabs as the apocalypse that would usher in the new age, but there are distinctive influences that can be noted in this movement from Shi'ism. The idea of the illiterate prophet is equated with the story of Muhammad and his receiving of the Qur'an while the idea of a chain of prophets is notably similar to the Imams and the foreseen coming of the Mahdi. Scholars disagree to what degree Shi'ism affected Abu Isa or whether Shi'ism was at the same time developing and incorporating Jewish elements   However, issues with this include that Shi'a reject the belief Muhammad was unlettered, Imams are infallible, that Shi'ism did not expect the immediate return of al-Mahdi, and that Iraq and Iran were not primarily Shi'a until a few centuries ago.

See also
Jewish Messiah claimants

References

Further reading
 
 
 
 

Jewish messiah claimants
Prophets in Judaism
Year of birth unknown
Year of death unknown
Medieval Persian Jews
8th-century Jews
Rebellions against the Umayyad Caliphate
8th-century people from the Abbasid Caliphate
People killed in action
History of Isfahan Province
Jews from the Abbasid Caliphate